This page includes a list of biblical proper names that start with M in English transcription. Some of the names are given with a proposed etymological meaning. For further information on the names included on the list, the reader may consult the sources listed below in the References and External Links.

A – B – C – D – E – F – G – H – I – J – K – L – M – N – O – P – Q – R – S – T – U – V – Y – Z

M

 Maachah
 Maachathi
 Maadai
 Maadiah, a priest
 Maai
 Maale-akrabbim
 Maarath
 Maaseiah
 Maasiai
 Maath
 Maaz
 Macedonia, extended land
 Machbenah
 Machi, decrease
 Machir
 Machnadebai
 Machpelah
 Madai
 Madian
 Madmannah
 Madon
 Magbish
 Magdala
 Magdalene
 Magdiel
 Magog, region of Gog
 Magpiash
 Mahalah
 Mahaleleel
 Mahali
 Mahanaim
 Mahanehdan
 Maharai
 Mahath
 Mahavites
 Mahazioth
 Maher-shalal-hash-baz
 Mahlah
 Makaz
 Makheloth
 Makkedah
 Malachi
 Malcham
 Malchijah
 Malchiel
 Malchus
 Maleleel
 Mallothi
 Malluch
 Mammon
 Mamre
 Manaen
 Manahethites
 Manasseh
 Manoah
 Maon
 Mara, Marah,
 Maralah
 Maranatha
 Mareshah
 Mark, the evangelist
 Maroth
 Marsena
 Martha
 Mary
 Mash
 Mashal
 Masrekah
 Massa
 Massah
 Matred
 Matri
 Mattan, Mattana, Mattenai
 Mattaniah, 
 Mattatha
 Matthias
 Mattathias
 Matthan
 Matthew
 Mazzaroth
 Meah
 Mearah
 Mebunnai
 Medad
 Medan
 Medeba
 Media
 Megiddo
 Megiddon
 Mehetabel
 Mehida
 Mehir
 Mehujael
 Mehuman
 Mejarkon
 Mekonah
 Melatiah
 Melchi
 Melchiah
 Melchi-shua
 Melchizedek
 Melea
 Melech
 Melita
 Melzar
 Memphis
 Memucan
 Menahem
 Menan
 Mene
 Meonenim
 Mephaath
 Mephibosheth
 Merab
 Meraioth
 Merari
 Mered
 Meremoth
 Meres
 Meribah
 Meribaal
 Merodach
 Merodach-baladan
 Merom
 Meronothite
 Meroz
 Mesha
 Meshach
 Meshech
 Meshelemiah
 Meshillemoth
 Mesobaite
 Mesopotamia
 Messiah
 Metheg-ammah
 Methusael
 Methuselah
 Meunim
 Mezahab
 Miamin
 Mibhar
 Mibsam
 Mibzar
 Micah
 Micaiah
 Micha
 Michael
 Michaiah
 Michal
 Michmash
 Michmethah
 Michri
 Michtam
 Middin
 Midian
 Migdal-el
 Migdal-gad
 Migdol
 Migron
 Mijamin
 Mikloth
 Milalai
 Milcah
 Milcom
 Miletus
 Millo
 Miniamin
 Minni
 Minnith
 Miriam
 Mishael
 Mishal
 Misham
 Mishael
 Mishma
 Mishmannah
 Mishraites
 Mispar
 Misrephoth-maim
 Misti
 Mithcah
 Mithnite
 Mithredath
 Mitylene
 Mizar
 Mizpah
 Mizraim
 Mizzah
 Mnason
 Moab
 Moladah
 Molech
 Molid, begetter;
 Mordecai, dedicated to Mars, a little man or bitter bruising; 
 Moreh
 Moriah
 Moserah (Mosera, Moseroth)
 Moses, to draw drawn forth, taken out of water or a son;
 Mozah
 Muppim
 Mushi
 Myra
 Mysia

References
 Comay, Joan, Who's Who in the Old Testament, Oxford University Press, 1971, 
 Lockyer, Herbert, All the men of the Bible, Zondervan Publishing House (Grand Rapids, Michigan), 1958
 Lockyer, Herbert, All the women of the Bible, Zondervan Publishing 1988, 
 Lockyer, Herbert, All the Divine Names and Titles in the Bible, Zondervan Publishing 1988, 
 Tischler, Nancy M., All things in the Bible: an encyclopedia of the biblical world , Greenwood Publishing, Westport, Conn. : 2006

Inline references 

M